Necrobiotic xanthogranuloma (also known as "necrobiotic xanthogranuloma with paraproteinemia") is a multisystem disease that affects older adults, and is characterized by prominent skin findings.

See also 
 List of cutaneous conditions

References

External links 

Monocyte- and macrophage-related cutaneous conditions